Samt und Seide is a German television series.

See also
List of German television series

External links
 

2000 German television series debuts
2005 German television series endings
German-language television shows
ZDF original programming